WHRT-LP was a television station in Sebring, Florida on channel 17. It was carried on Comcast Cable channel 12 in the area.

The station's license was cancelled by the Federal Communications Commission on March 1, 2018.

External links

HRT-LP
Television channels and stations established in 1996
1996 establishments in Florida
Defunct television stations in the United States
Television channels and stations disestablished in 2018
2018 disestablishments in Florida
HRT-LP